Jama Masjid Thal is a mosque located in Upper Dir District, which has a central position in Kumrat Valley.

The specialty of this mosque is that it is made of pure wood, the pillars and beams in the mosque are very large, which are almost impossible to install without missionaries.

This mosque was built in 1865. In 1930, there was a fire in this mosque, which partially damaged this mosque. Then the local people repair and rebuilt it with wood. In 1998, the work on the second floor of the mosque started and the construction of the mosque was completed in about nine years.

References 

Mosques in Khyber Pakhtunkhwa
Upper Dir District